Spring Stampede was a professional wrestling pay-per-view (PPV) event from World Championship Wrestling (WCW) held in the month of April in 1994 and then from 1997 to 2000. As it was called Spring Stampede, the event was usually Cowboy/Wild West themed. Since 2001, WWE owns the rights to the Spring Stampede event. In 2014, all WCW pay-per-views were made available on the WWE Network.

Dates, venues, and main events

References

External links
Spring Stampede results

 
Recurring events established in 1994
Recurring events disestablished in 2000